Severe Tropical Cyclone Nigel was the second of two tropical cyclones to affect Northern Vanuatu and the Fijian islands during January 1985. The system was first noted as an ill-defined low-pressure area ("low") located within the Intertropical Convergence Zone near the Cape York Peninsula. Over the next few days the low moved eastwards and increased in strength; it was named Nigel on January 16 as it developed into a tropical cyclone.

Meteorological history

Severe Tropical Cyclone Nigel was first noted as an ill-defined low, located within the Intertropical Convergence Zone near the Cape York Peninsula during January 1985. Over the next several days, the system gradually moved eastwards into the Coral Sea, before the Australian Bureau of Meteorology (BoM) reported that a recognizable circulation had developed during January 14. Over the next two days, the low moved eastwards and slowly developed further, before the Joint Typhoon Warning Center (JTWC) initiated advisories on the system and designated it as Tropical Cyclone 13P early on January 16. Later that day the BoM named the system Nigel as it became equivalent to a modern-day category 1 tropical cyclone on the Australian tropical cyclone intensity scale and moved out of the Australian region into the South Pacific basin. By this time, the JTWC were reporting that Nigel, had become equivalent to a category 1 hurricane on the Saffir–Simpson hurricane wind scale. During January 17, Nigel developed an eye and became equivalent to a category 3 severe tropical cyclone, before it passed very near to or over various northern Vanuatuan islands, including Espiritu Santo.

During January 18, Nigel's eyewall started to appear on Nadi airports surveillance radar, as it had started to move south-eastwards towards Fiji. During January 19, as the system moved closer towards Nadi its eye became more distinct on the radar, which showed that Nigel had started to slowly weaken, possibly due to strong vertical wind shear and dry air driven up from higher latitudes by Cyclone Eric. Later that day at around 04:00 UTC (16:00 FST), the system passed near Fiji's southern Yasawa Islands and northern Mamanuca Islands. The centre of Nigel's eye subsequently made landfall on Fiji's largest island Viti Levu about an hour later, while equivalent to a category 3 severe tropical cyclone. As Nigel moved inland it rapidly weakened due to frictional forces and became equivalent to a category 1 tropical cyclone on the Australian scale. The system subsequently emerged into the Pacific Ocean later that day, before it passed through the Tongan Islands and to the south of Niue during January 20.

Preparations and impact

Vanuatu
Cyclone Nigel was the second of three tropical cyclones to affect Vanuatu within a week, and the second of five tropical cyclones to impact Vanuatu in 1985. Nigel affected the islands of Espiritu Santo, Ambae, Maewo and Pentecost between January 17 and 18, and was thought to have caused more damage than Cyclone Eric.

After assessing the damage and finding thousands of people homeless, the Government of Vanuatu established a disaster relief and reconstruction fund.

The Government of Vanuatu asked the Australian Government for emergency food aid and other emergency humanitarian relief assistance including shelters and sanitation equipment. Australia flew in four survey teams by helicopter and sent six C-130 plane loads of humanitarian assistance which included plastic sheeting, ropes, medical supplies, clothing and rice. UNDRO and the governments of the UK and the USA donated money to the Vanuatuan Government, while France donated a cargo of food that was flown in from Nouméa, New Caledonia.

Fiji
Nigel was the second of two severe tropical cyclones to make landfall on the Fijian Island of Viti Levu within 36 hours, and the second of four tropical cyclones to impact Fiji in 1985. Ahead of the system making landfall, relief efforts for Cyclone Eric, which had hit the same region just two days earlier, had to be suspended. As the system affected Fiji, around 1000 people took shelter in the Nadi International Airport passenger terminal.

Once Nigel left Fiji, on January 19, the relief effort from Cyclone Eric was resumed with ships sent to the outer islands to assess the damage. 272 tourists were flown back to Melbourne Airport during January 21, after they had been through both systems. The following day the Fijian Government outlined their long-term rehabilitation needs and requested international assistance from the United Nations Disaster Relief Organization and various countries. These needs included a six-month food-rationing project for 10,000 households, a rehabilitation program for 10,000 shelters and improved internal communication including between the FMS in Nadi and the capital city Suva. Australia donated  to the Fijian Prime Ministers Relief Fund in order to provide food to those who needed it.

See also

Cyclone Eric
Cyclone Evan
Cyclone Kina

References

External links

Track Map of Cyclone Nigel near Vanuatu, from the Vanuatu Meteorological Service

Tropical cyclones in Fiji
Category 3 South Pacific cyclones
Tropical cyclones in Vanuatu
Tropical cyclones in Tonga
Retired South Pacific cyclones
1984–85 South Pacific cyclone season
Tropical cyclones in 1985
Category 2 Australian region cyclones